The Diocese of Verdun is a Latin Church ecclesiastical territory or diocese of the Catholic Church in France. It is a suffragan diocese in the ecclesiastical province of the metropolitan Archdiocese of Besançon. The Diocese of Verdun corresponds to the département of Meuse in the région of Lorraine. The diocese is subdivided into 577 parishes.

History
The diocese dates back to the 4th century.  Traditionally the city was first evangelized around 332 by St Sanctinus, Bishop of Meaux, who became the first bishop. Sanctinus erected the first Christian oratory dedicated to St. Peter and St. Paul.

The first bishop known to history is St. Polychronius (Pulchrone) who lived in the fifth century and was a relative and disciple of St. Lupus de Troyes. "Other bishops worthy of mention are: St. Possessor (470–486); St. Firminus (486–502); St. Vitonus (Vanne) (502–529); St. Désiré (Desideratus) (529–554), St. Agericus (Airy) (554–591), friend of St. Gregory of Tours and of Fortunatus; St. Paul (630–648), formerly Abbot of the Benedictine Monastery of Tholey in the Diocese of Trier; and St. Madalvaeus (Mauve) (753–776)."

From 1624 to 1636, a large bastioned citadel was constructed on the site of the Abbey of Saint Vanne. The Church of Saint-Vanne was destroyed in 1832 and its cloister, which had been converted into barracks, was burned in 1870. 

Until 1801 Verdun was part of the ecclesiastical province of the Archbishop of Trier.  On November 29, 1801 it was suppressed and added to the Diocese of Nancy. On October 31, 1822 the diocese was re-established.

During World War I over 200 parishes fell under occupation by the German army and communication with the Bishop of Verdun practically cut off. The administration of the parishes was confided to Thomas Louis Heylen, Bishop of Namur, who had been appointed vicar apostolic to French territory under German occupation.

When the city came under bombardment the diocesan administration relocated to Bar-le-Duc and did not return until 1921. One hundred and fifty-three churches were destroyed and 166 damaged, including the Cathédrale Notre-Dame de Verdun, whose towers have never been rebuilt. Of 186 priests who enlisted, 13 were killed, 20 seriously wounded, and 50 taken prisoner. One hundred and sixty citations and diplomas of honor and 120 decorations were awarded to priests of the diocese.

Ordinaries

After the Concordat

 1823–1830: Etienne-Bruno-Marie d'Arbou
 1826–1831: François-Joseph de Villeneuve-Esclapon
 1832–1836: Placide-Bruno Valayer
 1836–1844: Augustin-Jean Le Tourneur
 1844–1866: Louis Rossat
 1867–1884: Augustin Hacquard
 1884–1887: Jean-Natalis-François Gonindard
 1887–1901: Jean-Pierre Pagis
 1901–1909: Louis-Ernest Dubois

20th century 
 1910–1913: Jean Arturo Chollet
 1914–1946: Charles-Marie-André Ginisty
 1946–1963: Marie-Paul-Georges Petit
 1963–1986: Pierre Francis Lucien Anatole Boillon
 1987–1999: Marcel Paul Herriot

21st century
From 2000 to September 2014: François Paul Marie Maupu
From September 2014: Jean-Paul Gabriel Émile Gusching

See also
Bishopric of Verdun
Verdun Cathedral

References

Books

External links
Website of the diocese
Catholic hierarchy
CatholiCity – Diocese of Verdun

Roman Catholic dioceses in France
Roman Catholic dioceses in the Holy Roman Empire
Dioceses established in the 4th century
4th-century establishments in Roman Gaul